Christopher Binyon Sarofim (born 1963) is an American businessman and fund manager.

He is the deputy chairman of Fayez Sarofim & Co, president of Sarofim International Management Company, and a director of the Sarofim Group.

Early life
Christopher Sarofim is the eldest son of Fayez Sarofim and his first wife, Louisa Stude Sarofim, is the daughter of Margaret and Herman Brown, the co-founder of Brown & Root.

Sarofim graduated from St. George's School in 1982, where he served on the board for 9 years. Sarofim received a bachelor's degree in history from Princeton University in 1986.

Career
After graduating from Princeton, Sarofim worked in corporate finance for Goldman Sachs, and then joined Fayez Sarofim & Co. At Fayez Sarofim & Co., he worked as an Associate (August 1988 – June 1993), then a Senior Associate (June 1993 – October 1994), a Principal (October 1994 – September 1999), and Vice President (September 1999 – September 2010).

Since 2010, he has been portfolio manager, vice chairman, and director of the company. He is a member of the firm's executive, finance, and investment committees, and president of their foreign advisory business, Sarofim International Management Company. He serves on the Board of Directors of Wood Partners, a privately held real estate development company, and Kemper Corporation, a publicly-traded insurance company.

Sarofim is a member of the Board of Trustees of The Brown Foundation, Inc and was on the board of the Texas Heart Institute. He is also on the Advisory Committee of the MD Anderson Cancer Center Board of Visitors, and serves on the UTHealth Development Board. He is the deputy chairman of Fayez Sarofim & Co. He is the designated successor of Fayez Sarofim.

Previously, Sarofim served on the board of directors of the Georgia O'Keeffe museum.

He and his wife, Courtney, were 2017 Community Champions, supporting Texas Children's Cancer Center's annual Celebration of Champions. They also support The Texan French Alliance for the Arts, and are both donors to the Houston Cinema Arts Society, and other organizations.

In May 2019, the Sarofims invested in New York based designer Adam Lippes.

In August 2020, Sarofim was appointed to the Baylor College of Medicine Board of Trustees.

Personal life
He was married to Valerie Biggs. They divorced in 2000. They had a daughter together, who was later the subject of a custody battle.

Sarofim is married to Courtney Lanier, daughter of Elyse and Bob Lanier, former mayor of Houston. Since 2010, she has been a partner at Sima Capital LLC, an alternative investments firm. They have two children.

References

1960s births
American money managers
American people of Coptic descent
Living people
Stock and commodity market managers